A number of steamships were named Mohawk, including

, an American passenger ship in service 1896–1948
, a British cargo ship in service 1900-1917 and torpedoed by 
, an American cargo ship in service 1908–25 with Clyde Steamship Company
, an American passenger cargo ship in service 1926–35 with Clyde Steamship Company

Ship names